Ouro-Nile Toure (born 31 December 1998) is a Togolese footballer who plays as a striker.

Career
Toure started his career with Brazilian side REC. In 2022, he signed for Sumgayit in Azerbaijan. On 7 August 2022, Toure debuted for Sumgayit during a 0–3 loss to Sabah (Azerbaijan).

References

External links

 Ouro-Nile Toure at playmakerstats.com 

1998 births
Association football forwards
Azerbaijan Premier League players
Expatriate footballers in Azerbaijan
Expatriate footballers in Brazil
Living people
Paraná Soccer Technical Center players
Sumgayit FK players
Togolese expatriate footballers
Togolese expatriate sportspeople in Azerbaijan 
Togolese footballers